Happy Hell Night (also known as Frat Night) is a 1992 a Canadian slasher film directed by Brian Owens and starring Darren McGavin and Nick Gregory. The film also features brief appearances by Sam Rockwell and Jorja Fox in their early careers.

Plot
On Halloween night 1965, a fallen Catholic priest named Zachary Malius murders seven fraternity pledges from Winfield College who apparently broke into his family's crypt and enacted an occult initiation ritual. After being confronted by his peer, Father Cane, who believed Malius was possessed, Malius was incarcerated in an insane asylum for his crimes; Henry Collins, a pledge that year, was the only survivor.

In 1991, during pledge week, the university students are preparing for hell night. Fraternity member Eric Collins, the son of Henry, is suggested by his fraternity brother Ned to have the new pledges break into the local insane asylum and photograph Malius as their initiation ritual. Eric later mentions the prospect to his father over the phone, which causes Henry to cut their call short. Later that afternoon, Eric finds his girlfriend Liz having sex with his younger brother, Sonny, in a hotel room. To punish him, Eric appoints Sonny and fellow pledge Ralph to photograph Malius as their initiation. Sonny and Ralph break into the asylum and find Malius's cell sequestered in the basement, but when Ralph attempts to take a photo, Malius attacks and kills him. Sonny flees on his motorcycle while Malius murders a nurse orderly before escaping.

Meanwhile, Liz attempts arrives at the party with her friend, Susan, and attempts to apologize to Eric at the party, but is rebuffed. She finds Ned Bara, a nerdy fraternity member, downstairs, and he inadvertently reveals Sonny's initiation ritual to her. Concerned when Sonny fails to return by midnight, Liz stops by the local church and seeks advice from the priest, Father Cane. When she explains Sonny's initiation assignment, Cane panics and urges her to go into hiding. Back at the fraternity house, the party begins to phase out, and Eric initiates sex with a Kappa Sigma sorority sister, but she stops him when he cannot find a condom. She attempts to leave the fraternity house, but is subsequently murdered in her car by Malius, who drives an ice axe through her head. Malius subsequently kills several partygoers in the house. Meanwhile, Henry, arrives in town and visits the church, where he finds Cane's body hanging posed as the Cross of Saint Peter above the altar.

Liz returns to the fraternity shortly after, finding it apparently empty. Throughout the house, she discovers multiple corpses before being confronted by Malius, but she evades him. Eric and Sonny subsequently arrive, and the three band together with Ned, who has closed-circuit monitors of the house in his room. Communicating to Ned via a walkie-talkie, Eric, Sonny, and Liz locate Susan, who is decapitated in the attic. Malius stalks them through the house, before Eric shoots him with a speargun, and he falls out a window. Henry arrives moments later, and confesses that he and Malius conspired together in 1963 to recreate a Satanic ritual, in which Henry made a pact with the devil that yielded him power and wealth. Malius, unfazed, murders Ned downstairs before impaling Henry with the ice axe through the door, killing him.

Eric, Sonny, and Liz find a book in Latin inside Henry's satchel detailing the ritual he performed with Malius twenty-five years earlier.  Eric and Liz run to the cemetery and attempt to recreate the ritual in the Malius crypt. Malius arrives and stabs Eric through the chin, but is stopped from killing him when Sonny arrives moments later. Sonny and Liz complete the ritual, but Malius takes Sonny with him to hell.  The police arrive at the cemetery shortly after, and Liz leaves with Eric in an ambulance. As she assures Eric everything is going to be alright, the ambulance driver turns around and reveals himself to be Malius.

Cast

Production

The film was shot in Toronto, Ontario, Canada, and was financed through Pavlina Ltd., a Yugoslavian film production company.

Release
Happy Hell Night was released on video in the United States in April 1992, and was released in the United Kingdom on video under the title Hell Night (not to be confused with the 1981 film of the same name). It was also released under the title Frat Night in Europe. It subsequently screened on the Cinemax network throughout October 1992.

Home media
The film was released on DVD by Anchor Bay Entertainment on August 3, 2004. It was released for the first time on Blu-ray in a limited run by Code Red DVD on December 5, 2016, featuring a new 2k scan from the original vault materials.

Reception

Critical reception for Happy Hell Night has been mostly negative.
In a particularly scathing review, TV Guide wrote, "Happy Hell Night is the decrepit mule train of slasher films, taking up the rear and sweeping up the malignant droppings of the Friday the 13th, Halloween and Nightmare on Elm Street series, not to mention scores of other horror gore-fests of the 1980s. Mondo Digital wrote, "Strangely edited, extremely bloody, and often baffling, it's the kind of film slasher fanatics stumble on and scratch their heads trying to figure out how it all came together."

Eric Cotenas from DVD Drive-In gave the film a mixed review. While commending the film's atmosphere, cinematography, and performances; Cotenas criticized the film's plot as "overly familiar", the "underdeveloped" conflict between the two brothers, and lack of emotional resonance in the film's finale.

Reception from audiences was equally as critical. Happy Hell Night received a 2.5/ 5 average rating on Rotten Tomatoes, with only 25% of users rating the film higher than 3.5/5.

References

Sources

External links
 
 
 

1992 films
1992 horror films
1990s slasher films
Canadian slasher films
English-language Canadian films
Films about Catholic priests
Films about fraternities and sororities
Films set in universities and colleges
Films shot in Toronto
Films about fratricide and sororicide
1990s English-language films
1990s Canadian films